Hartvig is a given name. Notable people with the given name include:

Hartvig Caspar Christie (1893–1959), Norwegian politician
Hartvig Sverdrup Eckhoff (1855–1928), Norwegian architect
Hartvig Marcus Frisch (1754–1816) (1754–1816), Danish businessman
Hartvig Jentoft (1693–1739), Norwegian tradesman and sailor
Hartvig Johannson (1875–1957), Norwegian businessman
Hartvig Kiran (1911–1978), Norwegian author, lyricist and composer
Hartvig Krummedige (died 1476), Danish nobleman
Hartvig Lassen (1824–1897), Norwegian editor, educator and literary historian
Hartvig Andreas Munthe (1845–1905), Norwegian military officer, engineer and genealogist
Hartvig Nielsen (1908–?), Danish chess player
Hartvig Nissen (1815–1874), Norwegian philologist and educator
Hartvig Philip Rée (1778–1859), Danish merchant and author
Hartvig Asche von Schack (1644-1692), North German nobleman
Hartvig Svendsen (1902–1971), Norwegian politician

See also 
 Hartvig (surname)

Danish masculine given names
Norwegian masculine given names